Menthorpe Gate railway station was a station on the Selby to Driffield Line in North Yorkshire, England serving the village of North Duffield and the hamlets of Menthorpe and Bowthorpe. It appeared first in public timetables in 1851 and kept the "Gate" suffix when it was dropped from many other station names in 1864. In 1881, a station mistress is recorded.

The main station building, a two-storey brick building, was at the east end of the up platform, the signal box was on the west side of the level crossing on the down side of the line. The goods yard had two sidings and did not handle livestock.

The station closed to passengers on 7 December 1953 as the second of the intermediate stations on the line. It remained open for goods traffic until 27 January 1964. Station building and signalbox were dismantled in the early 1970s, only the crossing keeper's house still stands.

The 1881 census shows that Frances Calvert, a widow aged 69, was the "Station Mistress Railway" at Menthorpe Gate.

References

Further reading

External links
 Menthorpe Gate station on navigable 1947 O. S. map

Disused railway stations in North Yorkshire
Railway stations in Great Britain opened in 1853
Railway stations in Great Britain closed in 1953
Former York and North Midland Railway stations